Zvonimir Richtmann (22 November 19019 July 1941) was a Croatian-Jewish physicist, philosopher, politician and publicist who was killed during World War II by Ustaše.

Biography
Richtmann was born on 22 November 1901 in Zagreb, where he achieved his education. He studied at the Vienna University of Technology from where he graduated in 1925, and at the Faculty of Humanities and Social Sciences, University of Zagreb which he finished and graduated from in 1932. After graduation, Richtmann taught as a professor at the engineering high school in Zagreb. Richtmann held many public lectures and has published articles about physics. He is the author of several high school textbooks in physics and has written a book Sigmund Freud in 1937. He published articles about the relationship between modern science and philosophy which brings into question the Marxist–Leninist dogma. As a left-winger he was one of the key protagonists of the "left conflict" in Croatia. His article "Upheaval in the scientific picture of the world" was published in the first issue of Miroslav Krleža magazine "Seal". Article caused persecution of Richtmann and Krleža, who took him in protection. After that, Richtmann was proclaimed as revisionist and Trotskyist, and was systematically attacked. In 1939, Josip Broz Tito attacked Richtmann in the magazin "Proletarian" with the article "Trotskyism and it's helpers". As a leftist he was repeatedly imprisoned.

In April 1941, after the establishment of the Independent State of Croatia, Richtmann was arrested and imprisoned at Savska cesta prison. He was later moved to Kerestinec prison. Communists, with whom he was imprisoned, have boycotted Richtmann and at their request he was moved to another cell. On 9 July 1941 Richtmann was killed by Ustaše together with Božidar Adžija, Otokar Keršovani, Ognjen Prica and Viktor Rosenzweig.

References

Bibliography

 
 
 
 

1901 births
1941 deaths
Scientists from Zagreb
Croatian Jews
Austro-Hungarian Jews
Croatian Austro-Hungarians
Croatian scientists
Croatian communists
Jewish Croatian politicians
Croatian civilians killed in World War II
Deaths by firearm in Croatia
Faculty of Humanities and Social Sciences, University of Zagreb alumni
Jewish socialists
People executed by the Independent State of Croatia